State Route 225 (SR 225) is a  long north-south secondary state highway located in West Tennessee. It connects Hornsby with Henderson.

Route description

SR 225 just east of Hornsby at an intersection with US 64 (SR 15) in McNairy County. It winds its way north to enter Chester County and pass through wooded and hilly terrain, along with the communities of Woodville, Masseyville, Hickory Corners, and Montezuma. The highway then comes to an end near Henderson at an intersection with SR 100. The entire route of SR 225 is a rural two-lane highway.

Major intersections

References

225
Transportation in McNairy County, Tennessee
Transportation in Chester County, Tennessee